The Portuguese local elections of 1976 took place on sunday 12 December. They were the first local elections in Portugal. The democratic revolution of 1974 introduced the concept of democratic local power, that should be exerted by the citizens in their towns and cities. These elections ended a cycle of three elections in 1976, after the 1976 legislative election in April and the 1976 Presidential election in June.

The elections were meant to elect for the first time the administration of the about 300 municipalities of the country and of the about 4000 parishes that composed those 300 municipalities. They consisted of three elections in each of the municipalities; the election for the municipal chamber, the election for the municipal assembly and the lower-level election for the parish assembly.

The Socialist Party gathered the majority of the voting and mandates, beating the Social Democratic Party, although both parties tied in number of elected mayors, 115. The Communists led coalition, the Electoral Front United People, dominated the election in the South of the country. The right-wing Democratic Social Center achieved its best result ever in local elections.

Turnout in these elections was quite low, as 64.7% of the electorate cast a ballot, compared with the 83.5% turnout rate of the 1976 general elections in April.

Parties 
The main political forces involved in the election:

 Democratic and Social Center (CDS)
 Electoral Front United People (FEPU)
 Groups for the Dinamization of the People's Unity (GDUPs)
 Socialist Party (PS)
 Social Democratic Party (PSD)

Results

Municipal Chamber

National summary of votes and seats

|-
! rowspan="2" colspan=2 style="background-color:#E9E9E9" align=left|Parties
! rowspan="2" style="background-color:#E9E9E9" align=right|Votes
! rowspan="2" style="background-color:#E9E9E9" align=right|%
! rowspan="2" style="background-color:#E9E9E9" align=right|Candidacies
! style="background-color:#E9E9E9" align="center"|Councillors
! style="background-color:#E9E9E9" align="center"|Mayors
|- style="background-color:#E9E9E9"
! style="background-color:#E9E9E9" align="center"|Total
! style="background-color:#E9E9E9" align="center"|Total
|-
| 
|align=right| 1,377,684
|align=right| 33.01
|align=right| 
|align=right| 691 
|align=right| 115 
|-
| 
|align=right| 1,014,092	
|align=right| 24.30
|align=right|
|align=right| 624 
|align=right| 115
|- 
| 
|align=right| 720,499 
|align=right| 17.26
|align=right|
|align=right| 268 
|align=right| 37 
|-
| 
|align=right| 693,766
|align=right| 16.62
|align=right| 
|align=right| 317
|align=right| 36
|-
|style="width: 10px" bgcolor=red align="center" | 
|align=left|GDUPs
|align=right| 103,784
|align=right| 2.49
|align=right| 
|align=right| 5 
|align=right| 0
|-
| 
|align=right| 27,505
|align=right| 0.59
|align=right| 
|align=right| 0
|align=right| 0
|-
| 
|align=right| 15,267 	
|align=right|0.37
|align=right|
|align=right| 0 
|align=right| 0
|-
| 
|align=right| 7,528
|align=right|0.18
|align=right|  
|align=right| 3
|align=right| 1 
|-
| 
|align=right| 3,464
|align=right| 0.08
|align=right| 
|align=right| 0 
|align=right| 0
|-
| 
|align=right| 273
|align=right| 0.00
|align=right|  
|align=right| 0 
|align=right| 0
|-
| 
|align=right| 123
|align=right| 0.00
|align=right|  
|align=right| 0 
|align=right| 0
|-
|colspan=2 align=left style="background-color:#E9E9E9"|Total valid
|width="65" align="right" style="background-color:#E9E9E9"|3,995,905
|width="40" align="right" style="background-color:#E9E9E9"|96.40
|width="40" align="right" style="background-color:#E9E9E9"|—
|width="45" align="right" style="background-color:#E9E9E9"|1,908
|width="65" align="right" style="background-color:#E9E9E9"|304
|-
|colspan=2|Blank ballots
|89,073||2.13||colspan=6 rowspan=4|
|-
|colspan=2|Invalid ballots
|88,783||2.13
|-
|colspan=2 align=left style="background-color:#E9E9E9"|Total
|width="65" align="right" style="background-color:#E9E9E9"|4,173,761
|width="40" align="right" style="background-color:#E9E9E9"|100.00
|-
|colspan=2|Registered voters/turnout
||6,454,990||64.66
|}

Municipality map

City control
The following table lists party control in all district capitals, as well as in municipalities above 100,000 inhabitants. Population estimates from the 1970 Census.

Municipal Assemblies

National summary of votes and seats

|-
! rowspan="2" colspan=2 style="background-color:#E9E9E9" align=left|Parties
! rowspan="2" style="background-color:#E9E9E9" align=right|Votes
! rowspan="2" style="background-color:#E9E9E9" align=right|%
! rowspan="2" style="background-color:#E9E9E9" align=right|Candidacies
! style="background-color:#E9E9E9" align="center"|Mandates
|- style="background-color:#E9E9E9"
! style="background-color:#E9E9E9" align="center"|Total
|-
| 
|align=right| 1,392,181 	
|align=right| 33.39
|align=right| 
|align=right| 1,698
|-
| 
|align=right| 1,022,168
|align=right| 24.52
|align=right| 
|align=right| 1,658 
|-
| 
|align=right| 756,856 	 	
|align=right| 18.15
|align=right| 
|align=right| 679
|-
| 
|align=right| 685,574  	
|align=right| 16.44
|align=right| 
|align=right|1,053 
|-
|style="width: 10px" bgcolor=red align="center" | 
|align=left|GDUPs
|align=right| 100,872 	
|align=right| 2.42
|align=right|  
|align=right| 43
|-
| 
|align=right| 5,363
|align=right| 0.13
|align=right| 
|align=right| 2
|-
| 
|align=right| 5,214  	  	  	  	
|align=right| 0.13
|align=right|  
|align=right| 0
|-
| 
|align=right| 3,695  	
|align=right|0.09
|align=right| 
|align=right| 2 
|-
| 
|align=right|  2,634 	 	
|align=right|  0.06
|align=right| 
|align=right|  0 
|-
| 
|align=right|  970
|align=right|  0.02
|align=right|  
|align=right|  0
|-
|colspan=2 align=left style="background-color:#E9E9E9"|Total valid
|width="65" align="right" style="background-color:#E9E9E9"|3,975,596
|width="40" align="right" style="background-color:#E9E9E9"|95.36
|width="40" align="right" style="background-color:#E9E9E9"|—
|width="65" align="right" style="background-color:#E9E9E9"|5,135
|-
|colspan=2|Blank ballots
|104,185||2.50||colspan=6 rowspan=4|
|-
|colspan=2|Invalid ballots
|89,241||2.26
|-
|colspan=2 align=left style="background-color:#E9E9E9"|Total
|width="65" align="right" style="background-color:#E9E9E9"|4,169,022
|width="40" align="right" style="background-color:#E9E9E9"|100.00
|-
|colspan=2|Registered voters/turnout
||6,453,783||64.60
|}

Parish Assemblies

National summary of votes and seats

|-
! rowspan="2" colspan=2 style="background-color:#E9E9E9" align=left|Parties
! rowspan="2" style="background-color:#E9E9E9" align=right|Votes
! rowspan="2" style="background-color:#E9E9E9" align=right|%
! rowspan="2" style="background-color:#E9E9E9" align=right|Candidacies
! style="background-color:#E9E9E9" align="center"|Mandates
! style="background-color:#E9E9E9" align="center"|Presidents
|- style="background-color:#E9E9E9"
! style="background-color:#E9E9E9" align="center"|Total
! style="background-color:#E9E9E9" align="center"|Total
|-
| 
|align=right| 1,339,460 	
|align=right| 32.69
|align=right| 
|align=right| 8,345
|align=right|
|-
| 
|align=right| 996,972 	  	 	
|align=right| 24.33
|align=right| 
|align=right| 9,076 
|align=right| 
|-  
| 
|align=right| 629,812	   	 	
|align=right| 15.37
|align=right| 
|align=right| 2,291
|align=right| 
|-
| 
|align=right|  617,690 	
|align=right|  15.07
|align=right|   
|align=right|  5,077
|align=right|  
|-
|style="width: 8px" bgcolor=gray align="center" |
|align=left|Independents
|align=right|  162,367 	
|align=right|  3.96
|align=right|  
|align=right|  1,230 
|align=right| 
|-
|style="width: 10px" bgcolor=red align="center" | 
|align=left|GDUPs
|align=right| 93,967  	
|align=right| 2.29
|align=right| 
|align=right| 99 
|align=right| 
|-
| 
|align=right| 13,721	
|align=right| 0.33
|align=right|  
|align=right| 2
|align=right| 
|-
| 
|align=right| 1,788
|align=right| 0.04
|align=right|
|align=right| 12
|align=right|
|-
| 
|align=right| 1,666  	   	
|align=right| 0.04
|align=right| 
|align=right| 3 
|align=right|
|-
| 
|align=right| 71  	
|align=right| 0.00
|align=right| 
|align=right| 0 
|align=right|
|-
|colspan=2 align=left style="background-color:#E9E9E9"|Total valid
|width="65" align="right" style="background-color:#E9E9E9"|3,915,120
|width="40" align="right" style="background-color:#E9E9E9"|95.55
|width="40" align="right" style="background-color:#E9E9E9"|—
|width="65" align="right" style="background-color:#E9E9E9"|26,135
|width="50" align="right" style="background-color:#E9E9E9"| 
|-
|colspan=2|Blank ballots
|88,985||2.17||colspan=6 rowspan=4|
|-
|colspan=2|Invalid ballots
|93,461||2.28
|-
|colspan=2 align=left style="background-color:#E9E9E9"|Total
|width="65" align="right" style="background-color:#E9E9E9"|4,097,566
|width="40" align="right" style="background-color:#E9E9E9"|100.00
|-
|colspan=2|Registered voters/turnout
||6,246,594||65.60
|}

Maps

Notes 

 The source of the voting data is the Portuguese Electoral Commission

Further Notes:

 Electoral Front United People (FEPU) was composed by the Portuguese Communist Party (PCP), the Portuguese Democratic Movement (MDP/CDE) and the People's Socialist Front (FSP).
 The number of candidacies expresses the number of municipalities or parishes in which the party or coalition presented lists.
 The number of mandates expresses the number of municipal deputies in the Municipal Assembly election and the number of parish deputies in the Parish Assembly election.
 The turnout varies because one may choose not to vote for all the organs.

See also
 Politics of Portugal
 List of political parties in Portugal
 Elections in Portugal

References

External links
 Comissão Nacional de Eleições

1976
Local elections
Portuguese local elections